Natsagsürengiin Zolboo (born 14 December 1990) is a Mongolian freestyle wrestler.

He won silver medal in the 125 kg category in the 2014 Asian Wrestling Championships in Astana, Kazakhstan, losing to Komeil Ghasemi.

References

External links
 UWW Profile

1990 births
Living people
Mongolian male sport wrestlers
Wrestlers at the 2018 Asian Games
Asian Games competitors for Mongolia
Asian Wrestling Championships medalists
21st-century Mongolian people